Da Rap Star is the third studio album by rapper Bohemia. It was released in 2009 under the label of Universal Music India. The album gathered a total of four nominations at the PTC Punjabi music awards and UK Asian Music Awards.

Track listing

Accolades 

|-
| style="text-align:center;"|2010
| rowspan="1" style="text-align:center;"|"Da Rap Star"
| Best Punjabi Album at PTC Punjabi music awards
|
|-
| style="text-align:center;"|2010
| rowspan="1" style="text-align:center;"|"Da Rap Star"
| Best Sound Recording at PTC Punjabi music awards
|
|-
| style="text-align:center;"|2010
| rowspan="1" style="text-align:center;"|"Da Rap Star"
| Best Punjabi Music Director at PTC Punjabi music awards
|
|-
| style="text-align:center;"|2010
| rowspan="1" style="text-align:center;"|"Da Rap Star"
| Best International Album at UK Asian Music Awards
|

References

External links

2009 albums
Hip hop albums by American artists